Janelle Lynch (born 1969) is an American artist whose images reveal an inquiry into themes of connection, presence, and transcendence. She uses an 8x10-inch view camera. While she photographed exclusively in the landscape for the first two decades of her career, Lynch's practice has expanded to include portraiture, still life, and cyanotype.

Photographic series

River

In 2001, she began her River series.  It consists of 10 photographs that she made along the Hudson River in Manhattan, and explores impermanence and cultural change through historical urban architecture. In 2006, Alison Nordstrom, Curator at the George Eastman Museum acquired three images from the series and featured them in the 2007 Biennial Exhibition Vital Signs: Place. In 2007, River was a finalist for PhotoEspaña's Descubrimientos Award and a finalist for the competition at Hyères, the International Festival of Photography and Fashion. River was nominated for the Prix Pictet in 2008. Since then, the series has been exhibited in six countries. It is in collections worldwide, including The Metropolitan Museum of Art, the Brooklyn Museum, The New York Public Library, the Newark Museum, the New-York Historical Society, and the Museum of the City of New York.

Los Jardines de México 
Los Jardines de México begins with El Jardín de Juegos (Mexico City, 2002-2003), in Mexico City, where she lived for three years. Made with a 4 × 5-inch camera, the images, void of people, as are all of the works in the book, show the relics of a children's playground conquered by nature and neglect.

The Donde Andaba series (Mexico City, 2005), made with a 6 x 7-cm format camera, follows and represents a progression from the prior series in both content and form. The images juxtapose wild plant life with architecture and explore the subject of the persistence of life despite its ambient conditions.

Akna, the Mayan goddess of birth and fertility, is also believed to be a guardian saint. The photographs in this series, Akna (Chiapas, 2006), Lynch's first with an 8 × 10-inch camera, are portraits of anthropomorphized tree stumps in a nature reserve, which investigate the theme of regeneration.

Lynch made the final series in the book, La Fosa Común (Mexico City, 2007), also with an 8 × 10-inch camera, in the functioning, century-old common grave, centrally located within the city. The photographs of vegetation in various stages of the life cycle, coupled with subtle suggestions of the setting, further the exploration of notions of loss and death that El Jardín de Juegos began in 2002–2003, while simultaneously celebrating life and its intricate beauty.

In 2008, Los Jardines de México was named a finalist for the Santa Fe Prize for Photography.

Radius Books published Los Jardines de México in 2011, with a work of short fiction by Mexican author Mario Bellatín and essay by Mexican architect and landscape designer, José Antonio Aldrete-Hass. Los Jardines de México has been internationally exhibited, including one-woman museum shows of the entire series at the Museo Archivo de la Fotografía, Mexico City (2011) and the Southeast Museum of Photography, Daytona Beach, FL (2013).

Barcelona 
From 2007 to 2011, while living in Spain, Lynch explored the fallow landscape outside of Barcelona. She photographed along waterways seminal to Catalonia's history to explore presence, memory and loss. With her 8 × 10-inch camera and a portrait lens, the artist photographed pylons, puddles, leaves, and litter as metaphors for themes of absence and presence, mourning and remembrance.

Following Los Jardines de México, Barcelona continues Lynch's long-term interest in representations of the life cycle in the landscape. Included with the five series of images that compose this project are writings in English and Spanish by the artist.

Radius published the work in her second monograph in 2013, Barcelona, with her nonfiction writings, including The Window, and the five related series she realized while living in Spain from 2007-2011. The book begins with a personal essay about Lynch's early relationship with nature. Woven throughout the remaining pages are text about and quotes from Charles Burchfield, Wendell Berry and Roland Barthes, whose works have been influential in Lynch's process.

The American Institute of Graphic Arts named Barcelona a recipient of their 50 Books/ 50 Covers Award. In 2015, Barcelona was nominated for the Prix Pictet. In 2013, Lynch's Walls series (from Barcelona) was a finalist for The Cord Prize.

Presence
In 2013, Lynch was the first Artist-in-Residence at the Burchfield Penney Art Center in Buffalo, NY. By then, the painter Charles Burchfield had been an important influence for many years. The resulting year-long project, Presence, uses naturally occurring connections in the landscape to affirm kinships with creative influences and progenitors of the environmental movement. In 2014, the Center acquired the work and Nancy Weekly, Burchfield Scholar, curated an exhibition of it in the Burchfield Rotunda, a space that until my show had been exclusively dedicated to Burchfield's work.

Another Way of Looking at Love 
In 2018, Radius published her third monograph, Another Way of Looking at Love, which she co- designed. It includes an essay by Darius Himes, International Head of Photographs, Christies. Another Way of Looking at Love is a three-year project that was influenced by her drawing and painting from observation at the New York Studio School and from her interest in relational-cultural theory.

Borne of awe for the power of nature, Another Way of Looking at Love seeks to inspire connection: to one another, to the planet, and to the generative possibilities of the present moment. It is influenced by Mary Oliver's poetry, Rebecca Solnit's writings about "slow seeing," Jon Kabat-Zinn's research on mindfulness and neuroscience, as well as Amy Banks' research on Relational Cultural Theory, which emphasizes the importance of loving human connections and their impact on our lives, culture, and planet.

In 2019, Another Way of Looking at Love was shortlisted for the Prix Pictet, the award for photography and sustainability. The theme was "hope." The Victoria and Albert Museum has since acquired five images from the series for their permanent collection. An exhibition of all shortlisted artists' work opened at the Victoria and Albert Museum in London in November 2019 and began its world tour to venues in Japan, Switzerland, and Russia, among others.

Lynch's fourth one-woman museum exhibition, Janelle Lynch: Another Way of Looking at Love, opened in September 2019 at the Hudson River Museum in Yonkers, NY, and was on view until February 2020.

In February 2020, NPR's The Picture Show featured Another Way of Looking at Love in "A Photographer's Guide To 'Slow Seeing' The Beauty In Everyday Nature."

Collections 
Lynch's work is held in the following public collections:
Metropolitan Museum of Art, New York, NY
Victoria and Albert Museum, London UK
Southeast Museum of Photography, Daytona Beach, FL
Hudson River Museum, Yonkers, NY
New York Public Library, New York, NY
York Historical Society, New York, NY
Brooklyn Museum, Brooklyn, NY
Newark Museum, Newark, NJ
George Eastman Museum, Rochester, NY
Burchfield Penney Art Center, Buffalo, NY
Fundacio Vila Casa, Barcelona, Spain
Centro de Fotografía, Tenerife, Spain
Fundación AMYC, Madrid, Spain
Villa Noailles, Hyères, France
Museum of Contemporary Photography, Chicago, IL 
Stanford University, Stanford, CA

Exhibitions

Solo exhibitions 

 Delaware Valley Arts Alliance, Narrowsburg, NY, 2020
 Hudson River Museum, Yonkers, NY, 2019–2020
 Burchfield Penney Art Center, Buffalo, NY, 2014 (catalog)
 Southeast Museum of Photography, Daytona Beach, FL, 2013
 Robert Morat Galerie, Berlin, 2013
 Museo Archvio de la Fotografía, Mexico City, Mexico, 2011
 Photofusion, London, 2008
 , Argentina, 2008
 Centro Cultural Banco de Brasil, Brasília, Brazil, 2007 (catalog)
 Furman University, Greenville, SC, 2005
 University of California Berkeley, San Francisco Extension, San Francisco, CA, 2003

Group exhibitions 
Museum of the City of New York, New York City, January 22, 2020 – May 15, 2022)

 Hope, Prix Pictet touring exhibition, Hillside Forum, Tokyo, 2019; ArtLab, EPFL, Lausanne, Switzerland, 2020; Mouravieff-Apostol House & Museum, Moscow, 2020; Gallery of Photography, Dublin, September 11 – November 6, 2021; Shanghai Centre of Photography, Shanghai, China, 2021; Grimaldi Forum, Monaco, 2021; Eretz Israel Museo, Tel Aviv, Israel, 2021; Palazzo della Gran Guardia, Verona, Italy, 2021

Awards and honors 
 2019: Prix Pictet, Shortlist
 2017–2019: The Hermitage Artist Retreat, Artist-in-Residence
 2013: Burchfield Penney Art Center, Artist-in-Residence 
 2013: AIGA, Award
 2013: The Cord Prize, Finalist
 2011: Kodak, Grant
 2009: Santa Fe Prize for Photography, Finalist
 2008: Kodak, Grant
 2007: Festival International de Mode et de Photographie à Hyères, Finalist
 2007: Kodak, Grant
 2007: PHotoEspaña Descubrimientos, Finalist

References

External links 

Flowers Gallery
Radius Books

1969 births
Living people
American women photographers
Photographers from New York (state)
School of Visual Arts alumni
21st-century American women